The Czech Republic is bound to adopt the euro in the future and to join the eurozone once it has satisfied the euro convergence criteria by the Treaty of Accession since it joined the European Union (EU) in 2004. The Czech Republic is therefore a candidate for the enlargement of the eurozone and it uses the Czech koruna as its currency, regulated by the Czech National Bank, a member of the European System of Central Banks, and does not participate in European Exchange Rate Mechanism II  (ERM II).

Although the Czech Republic is economically well positioned to adopt the euro, following the European debt crisis there has been considerable opposition among the public to the adoption of the euro currency. , there is no target date by the government for joining the ERM II or adopting the euro. The cabinet that was formed following the 2017 legislative election did not plan to proceed with euro adoption within its term, and this policy was continued by the succeeding cabinet formed after the 2021 election.

History

European Union accession and 2000s

The European Union membership referendum in 2003 approved the country's accession with 77.3% in favour, and in 2004 the Czech Republic joined the EU.

Since joining the EU in May 2004, the Czech Republic has adopted fiscal and monetary policies that aim to align its macroeconomic conditions with the rest of the European Union.  Initially, the Czech Republic planned to adopt the euro as its official currency in 2010, however evaluations in 2006 found this date to be unlikely and the target date was postponed indefinitely. In February 2007, the Finance Minister said 2012 was a "realistic" date, but by November 2007 this was said to be too soon. In August 2008, an assessment said that adoption was not expected before 2015 due to political reluctance on the subject. However, in October 2009, the then Finance Minister, Eduard Janota, stated that 2015 was no longer realistic. In June 2008, the Central bank governor Zdeněk Tůma speculated about 2019.

In late 2010 a discussion arose within the Czech government, partially initiated by then President Václav Klaus, a well known eurosceptic, over negotiating an opt-out from joining the eurozone. Czech Prime Minister Petr Nečas later stated that no opt-out was required because the Czech Republic could not be forced to join the ERM II and thus could decide if or when to fulfil one of the necessary criteria to join the eurozone, an approach similar to the one taken by Sweden. Nečas also stated that his cabinet would not decide upon joining the euro during its term.

2010s
The European debt crisis further decreased the Czech Republic's interest in joining the eurozone.  Nečas said that since the conditions governing the eurozone had significantly changed since their accession treaty was ratified, he believed that Czechs should be able to decide by a referendum whether to join the eurozone under the new terms. One of the government's junior coalition parties, TOP09, was opposed to a euro referendum.

In April 2013, the Czech Ministry of Finance stated in its Convergence Programme delivered to the European Commission that the country had not yet set a target date for euro adoption and would not apply for ERM II membership in 2013.  Their goal was to limit their time as an ERM II member, prior to acceding to the eurozone, to as brief a period as possible.  On 29 May 2013 Miroslav Singer, the Governor of the Czech National Bank (the Czech Republic's central bank) stated that in his professional opinion the Czech Republic will not adopt the euro before 2019. In December 2013, the Czech government approved a recommendation from the Czech National Bank and Ministry of Finance against setting a formal target date for euro adoption or joining ERM II in 2014.

Miloš Zeman, who was elected President of the Czech Republic in early 2013, supports euro adoption by the Czech Republic, though he also advocates a referendum on the decision. Shortly after taking office in March 2013, Zeman suggested that the Czech Republic would not be ready for the switch for at least five years.  Prime Minister Bohuslav Sobotka, from the Social Democrats, stated on 25 April 2013, prior to his party's election victory that October, that he was "convinced that the government that will be formed after next year's election should set the euro entry date" and that "1 January 2020 could be a date to look at".  Shortly after being sworn into the new Cabinet in January 2014, Czech Foreign Minister Lubomír Zaorálek stated that the country should join the eurozone as soon as possible. The opposition TOP 09 had also run on a platform in the 2013 parliamentary election, that called for the Czech Republic to adopt the euro between 2018 and 2020. In line with this, the governor of the Czech National Bank, having an advisory role towards the government about the timing of euro adoption, described 2019 as the earliest possible euro entry date.

In April 2014, the Czech Ministry of Finance clarified in its Convergence Programme delivered to the European Commission, that the country had not yet set a target date for euro adoption and would not apply for ERM-II membership in 2014. Their goal was to limit their time as an ERM-II member, prior to acceding to the eurozone, to as brief a period as possible. Moreover, it was the opinion of the previous government that: "the fiscal problems of the eurozone, together with continued difficulty to predict the development of the monetary union, do not create a favorable environment for the future adoption of the euro."

Zeman stated in June 2014 that he hoped his country would adopt the euro as soon as 2017, arguing that adoption would be beneficial for the Czech economy overall. The opposition ODS party responded by running a campaign for Czechs to sign an anti-euro petition, handed over to the Czech Senate in November 2014, but viewed by political commentators as not having any impact on changing the government's policy to adopt the euro in the medium-term without holding a referendum on it.

In December 2014, the Czech government approved a joint recommendation from the Czech National Bank and Ministry of Finance, against setting a formal target date for euro adoption or joining ERM-II during the course of 2015. In March 2015, the ruling Czech Social Democratic Party adopted a policy of striving to gather political support to adopt the euro by 2020. In April 2015, the coalition government announced it had agreed to not set a euro adoption target and not to enter ERM-2 until after the next legislative election scheduled for 2017, making it unlikely that the Czech Republic will adopt the euro before 2020. In addition, the coalition government agreed that if it wins re-election it would set a deadline of 2020 to agree on a specific euro adoption roadmap. In June 2015, finance minister Andrej Babiš suggested a nonbinding public referendum on euro adoption. The Andrej Babiš' Cabinet that was formed following the 2017 legislative election does not plan to proceed with euro adoption within its term.

2020s
Petr Fiala's cabinet that emerged from the 2021 legislative election does not intend to adopt euro within its term either, calling the adoption "disadvantageous" for the Czech Republic.

In 2023 President-elect Pavel said, that as a citizen he supports Euro adoption.

Euro use
Selected chain stores in the Czech Republic accept payments in euro cash, and return change in Czech koruna.

Opinion polls
The following are polls on the question whether the Czech Republic should abolish the koruna and adopt the euro currency.

Eurobarometer chart
Public support for the euro in the Czech Republic by each Eurobarometer survey

Adoption status 
The 1992 Maastricht Treaty originally required that all members of the European Union join the euro once certain economic criteria are met. The Czech Republic meets two of the five conditions for joining the euro ; their inflation rate, not being a member of the European exchange rate mechanism, and the incompatibility of its domestic legislation are the conditions not met.

Notes

References 

Euro coins
Euro by country
Euro